Farmers Business Network (FBN) is a farmer-to-farmer network and e-commerce platform based out of San Carlos, California. The company was co-founded by Amol Deshpande and Charles Baron, and launched as a startup in 2014. Deshpande stepped down as CEO in 2023 and wes replaced by John Vaske. As of 2021, FBN has approximately 30,000 farmers in their network between the U.S. and Canada.
 
In 2016, FBN launched an online input buying system called FBN Direct. The platform aggregates data on seed prices and performances to assist farmers in agronomic resource management.

The company introduced their first non-GMO corn and soybean seed offerings with F2F Genetics Network in August 2018. Some farmer members have reported saving thousands of dollars through the purchase of FBN seeds. Later in 2018, FBN announced a partnership with Amazon.

In 2019, U.S. Secretary of Agriculture Sonny Perdue attended FBN's annual Farmer2Farmer conference in Omaha, Nebraska, and gave a keynote speech. The event saw nearly 4,000 attendees.

In February of 2020, a Canadian federal court issued subpoenas to a group of major agriculture companies in order to conduct an antitrust probe based on allegations that businesses cooperated in an attempt to block online farm-supply startup Farmers Business Network Inc (FBN).

In 2020, the Wall Street Journal reported that the Canadian Competition Bureau was investigating allegations that Bayer, BASF, and Corteva engaged in anti-competitive practices toward FBN in Canada.

Early financial backers for FBN included Kleiner Perkins and GV.

References

Online companies of the United States
Agriculture companies established in 2014
American companies established in 2014